Francisco Sánchez Ramos (born 4 October 1970) is a Mexican politician from the Party of the Democratic Revolution. From 2006 to 2009 he served as Deputy of the LX Legislature of the Mexican Congress representing Tabasco.

References

1970 births
Living people
Politicians from Tabasco
Party of the Democratic Revolution politicians
21st-century Mexican politicians
Members of the Congress of Tabasco
Deputies of the LX Legislature of Mexico
Members of the Chamber of Deputies (Mexico) for Tabasco